White Trash Beautiful is the fourth solo studio album by American recording artist Everlast. It was released internationally on May 25, 2004 and a day later in the United States via Island Records. It has sold about 124,000 copies in the U.S.

The record peaked at number 12 on German music charts, at number 21 on the Swiss music charts, at number 32 on Ö3 Austria Top 40, at number 56 on the US Billboard 200, and at number 124 on French music charts. The lead single of the album, "White Trash Beautiful", was dropped in March 2004 and also has been charted, but only in three major European charts: number 42 in Switzerland, number 59 in Germany, and number 64 in Austria. The official music video features American actor Aaron Paul.

Music and lyrics
White Trash Beautiful primarily mixes hip-hop tropes with arrangements built on bluesy strumming. Musically, Everlast and producer Dante Ross marry his gruff delivery with spare acoustic guitar layered in subdued hip-hop rhymths. The album features hip-hop references, including lyrical quotes, turntable scratches and explicit lines and bravado.

The album mainly blends country and blues into lyrical narratives of loneliness. Everlast uses a haggard voice for singing grim songs. He occasionally engages in rap clichés, with verses expressing street bravado and cynicism in addition to relationship issues and heartbreak.

Track listing

Personnel
Vocalists

Erik Francis Schrody - vocals
Jeni Fujita - backing vocals (tracks: 4-5, 9, 11)
Carlos Rigas - backing vocals (tracks: 3, 6, 10)
Sheree Brown - backing vocals (track 1)
Derek Murphy - backing vocals (track 5)
Louis Freese - backing vocals (track 14)

Instrumentalists

Justin Premino - bass (tracks: 4-5, 9, 13, 15)
Dorian Heartsong - bass (tracks: 1-2, 6, 10)
Chris Thomas - bass (tracks: 3, 7, 11)
Tobias Ralph - drums (tracks: 4, 9)
Johnathan Moouer - drums (tracks: 6, 13)
Joshua Lopez - guitar (tracks: 3, 7)
Rob Hill - guitar (track 6)
John Vercessi - keyboards (tracks: 4-5, 9, 11, 13, 15)
Keefus Ciancia - keyboards (tracks: 1, 3, 14)
Zac Rae - keyboards (tracks: 1-3, 6-7)
Dante Ross - keyboards (track 12)
Al Pahanish - percussion (track: 6, 10)
Miles Tackett - cello (track 2)
Angelo Moore - theremin (track 2)
Alma Cielo - violin (track 10)

Technicals

Erik Francis Schrody - producer (tracks: 1-3, 6-7, 10, 14), co-producer (tracks: 4-5, 9, 11, 13, 15), executive producer
Dante Ross - producer (tracks: 3-5, 9, 11-13, 15), co-producer (tracks: 1-2, 6-7, 10, 14), executive producer, recording (tracks: 4-5, 9, 11-13, 15)
Rob Hill - producer (tracks: 3, 6), co-producer (tracks: 1-2, 7, 10, 14), recording (tracks: 1-3, 6-7, 14)
Emile Haynie - producer (track 8)
John Gamble - recording (tracks: 4-5, 9, 11-13, 15)
Brian Gardner - mastering
Robert Power - mixing
Ari Raskin - assistant engineer
David Campbell - string arrangement (tracks: 7, 15)

Charts

References

2004 albums
Albums produced by Dante Ross
Albums produced by Emile Haynie
Blues albums by American artists
Island Records albums
Everlast (musician) albums